My Friend Flicka is a 1943 American Western film about a young boy, played by Roddy McDowall, who is given a young horse to raise. It is based on Mary O'Hara's popular 1941 children's novel of the same name. Thunderhead, Son of Flicka, released on March 15, 1945, was the sequel to My Friend Flicka.

Plot
Wyoming ranchers Rob (Preston Foster) and Nell McLaughlin (Rita Johnson) somewhat reluctantly decide to give their 10-year-old son, Ken (Roddy McDowall), a chance to raise a horse and learn about responsibility. He chooses a one-year-old chestnut mustang filly and names her Flicka, which ranch hand Gus (James Bell) informs him is a Swedish word for "girl".

Rising debts and a "loco" strain have created problems for the McLaughlins. They accept a $500 offer from a neighboring rancher for the young filly's mother, Rocket, who had been clocked running at 35 mph (56 km/h), but the mare is accidentally killed while being transported.

The situation gets worse when Flicka is badly cut by barbed wire and the wound becomes infected. Ken cares for her best he can, but the infection leads father Rob to conclude that the horse must be put down. A gunshot by his father makes Ken fear the worst, but it turns out he was warding off a mountain lion after being warned by Flicka. The filly's life is spared, and young Ken nurtures her back to health.

Cast
 Roddy McDowall as Ken McLaughlin
 Preston Foster as Rob McLaughlin
 Rita Johnson as Nell McLaughlin
 James Bell as Gus
 Diana Hale as Hildy
 Jeff Corey as Tim Murphy
 Arthur Loft as Charley Sargent (uncredited)

Production
Parts of the film were shot in Duck Creek, Aspen Mirror Lake, Rockville Road, Strawberry Valley, Johnson Canyon, Zion National Park, and Cedar Breaks National Monument in Utah.

Radio adaptation
A radio adaptation of My Friend Flicka was presented on Lux Radio Theatre June 7, 1943, starring McDowall and Johnson.

Reception
In 1943 the New York newspaper PM was pleased: "Seldom has Hollywood treated any part of the American scene with more warmth and charm and faithfulness than in My Friend Flicka. The sweeping ranchlands of the West…are here presented not as background for the…movie Western, but as the homeland of a real, believeable American family, glimpsed at a time of normal, credible crisis in the shaping of the character of an American boy….Roddy McDowell…is reliably winning and little Diana Hale…is a real darling".

The film aggregator Rotten Tomatoes gave the film 86%. The DVD, which came out during the early years of the 21st century, was warmly received by the critics. One such was DVD Verdict, which praised its "bright and vibrant" colors and its "superior transfer" from VHS to DVD. The film was also released in its original full frame and aspect ratio and contained three trailers: Bushwhacked, Far from Home: The Adventures of Yellow Dog, and Lucas along with a choice of English or Spanish audio and subtitles.

References

External links
 
 
 
 

1943 films
American coming-of-age drama films
Films about horses
Films based on American novels
Films based on children's books
Films scored by Alfred Newman
Films directed by Harold D. Schuster
American Western (genre) films
1943 Western (genre) films
Films set in Wyoming
Films shot in Utah
Films shot in Wyoming
20th Century Fox films
20th Century Studios franchises
Films based on works by Mary O'Hara
1943 drama films
1940s American films
Films with screenplays by Francis Edward Faragoh